The 1985 Georgia Tech Yellow Jackets football team represented the Georgia Institute of Technology in the 1985 NCAA Division I-A football season. The Yellow Jackets were led by sixth-year head coach Bill Curry and played their home games at Grant Field in Atlanta. In their third season as members of the Atlantic Coast Conference, they finished in second with an ACC record of 5–1. They were invited to the 1985 Hall of Fame Classic bowl game, where they defeated Michigan State, 17–14. The Yellow Jackets finished ranked in both the AP Poll and the Coaches' Poll for the first time in 15 years.

Schedule

Source:

References

Georgia Tech
Georgia Tech Yellow Jackets football seasons
All-American Bowl champion seasons
Georgia Tech Yellow Jackets football